Mata may refer to:

Places
 Mata, Iran, a village in Kerman Province, Iran
 Mata, Israel, a Moshav in the Judaean Mountains, south-west of Jerusalem, not far from Beit Shemesh
 Mata, Rio Grande do Sul, town in Brazil
 Mata Island, in the Hudson Bay of Nunavut, Canada
 Mata River, of the East Coast of North Island, New Zealand
 Mata, Afghanistan
 Mata, in Castelo Branco, Portugal
 Mata, Dianbai County (马踏镇), town in Guangdong, China

People
 Mata (surname), for people with the surname Mata
 Mata Amritanandamayi (born 1953), Hindu spiritual leader and guru
 Mata Hari (1876–1917), stage name of exotic dancer, courtesan and spy Margaretha Zelle
 Mata Sundari, Mata Jito, and Mata Sahib Kaur, the wives of Sikh guru Gobind Singh; according to one theory, the first two are the same person
 Mata Tripta, mother of Guru Nanak Dev, the founder of Sikhism
 Mata (rapper) (born 2000), Polish rapper

Entertainment
 Mata (2006 film), a Kannada language film
 Mata (1942 film), a Bollywood film
 MATA Festival, short for Music at the Anthology, Inc., a festival of contemporary classical music based in New York
 Mata (album), a 2022 album by M.I.A.

Other uses
 Ma Ta, Marathi newspaper based in Mumbai, India.
 Mata, may refer to Mataji
 Hindi term for mother - for example Skandamata, the mother of war god Skanda
Devi in Hindu religion
 Mata (cicada), a genus of cicadas
 Matha, is a Hindu religious institution

See also
 La Mata (disambiguation)
 Mata (programming language)
 MATA (disambiguation)
 Mata mata, a freshwater South American turtle
 Matas (disambiguation)
 Matos (disambiguation)